Results of India women's national football team from 2020s.

Legend

‡ are unofficial friendly matches after 1994, that are Non FIFA A international matches and are not considered for FIFA rankings.

2021

2022

2023

‡ are unofficial friendly matches after 1994, that are Non FIFA A international matches and are not considered for FIFA rankings.

See also
India national football team results (2020–present)
India women's national football team results (2010–2019)

References

2020